That's My Work 2 is a mixtape by American rapper Snoop Dogg, hosted by DJ Drama. It was released free for digital download via DatPiff on October 29, 2013.

Track listing

References 

2013 mixtape albums
Snoop Dogg albums